The Burning Train is a 1980 Indian action thriller disaster film, produced by B. R. Chopra under the B. R. Films banner and directed by Ravi Chopra. The film featured a huge all-star cast, featuring Dharmendra, Hema Malini, Vinod Khanna, Parveen Babi, Jeetendra, Neetu Kapoor, Vinod Mehra, Navin Nischol and Danny Denzogpa in the pivotal roles and music composed by R. D. Burman.

The plot  revolves around a train named the Super Express, that catches fire on its inaugural run from New Delhi  to Mumbai. This movie was inspired by an earlier Japanese disaster movie, The Bullet Train (1975). The Burning Train grossed , becoming the seventh highest-grossing Indian film of 1980.

Plot
Ashok Singh / Ashok (Dharmendra), Vinod Verma (Vinod Khanna), and Randhir (Danny Denzongpa) are childhood Best - friends. Ashok is the son of multi-millionaire Seth Dharmdas (Madan Puri) and likes fast cars, whereas Vinod and Randhir are engineers at the Indian Railway Board along with Rakesh (Vinod Mehra) and dream to build the fastest moving train in India. Since boyhood, Randhir is tetchy and wild and envies Vinod. Meanwhile, Ashok and Vinod fall for Seema (Hema Malini) and Sheetal (Parveen Babi), respectively. Randhir also aspires to possess Sheetal, but she pairs with Vinod, and they are blessed with a son, Raju (Master Bittoo), provoking hostility in Randhir. Suddenly, destiny plays with Ashok, his father faces bankruptcy following his death, Seema deceives him, and forlorn Ashok turns wanderer. At this juncture, the Indian Railway Board approves the fastest-moving train, the Super Express. Here, Vinod, Randhir, and Rakesh's designs are finalized, and Vinod prevails whereby malice of Randhir summits. After six years, Vinod triumphs in building the Super Express from Delhi to Bombay in 14 hours. But Vinod's obsession with the train ruins his marriage, so, Sheetal shoves Raju to her mother in the Super Express and banishes Vinod.

Then, the train begins signing-on many passengers, namely: Raja Ram Mohan (Om Shivpuri) with his wife Padmini (Indrani Mukherjee). A smuggler Chander (Ranjeet) with diamonds and fiancée Razia (Komilla Virk). An undercover cop Ranveer (Sujeet Kumar), disguised as a church father, is behind them. Major P.K. Bhandari (Asrani), a school teacher (Simi Garewal) with students, a Pandit Shambhunath (Rajendra Nath), a Muslim Abdul Rahim (Yunus Parvez), ticketless passengers (Keshto Mukherjee and Paintal) along with Rakesh's pregnant wife. Besides, Seema with her Doctor cousin (Navin Nischol) in addition, Ashok joins in his friend's success, and he is startled to see Seema. Above all, Ravi (Jeetendra), a prowler following Madhu (Neetu Singh), absconding with the jewelry, and on the ride, they fall in love. Randhir removes the vacuum brakes, plants a bomb in the engine, and quits the train. Meanwhile, Ashok accompanies him in the presence of Seema, and on chat, Randhir reveals his evil plan. Immediately, Ashok rushes and manages to catch the train. But it is too late, and halfway, the bomb explodes, killing the drivers, and the train proceeds without breaks. Panic-stricken, Vinod and the railway board desperately try to save the passengers. Thereof, Vinod converses with the passengers through All India Radio, and outlines the method of applying emergency brakes. At present, Ashok, Ravi, and the guard Usman Ali (Dinesh Thakur) make a plucky endeavor toward the engine.

In that chaos, the petrified train cooks fail to switch off the gas. At the same time, Rakesh's wife is in Pregnancy labor, and the doctor asks for hot water when a cook lights and the gas explodes, killing Usman Ali and several passengers. However, Ashok and Ravi barely make it back by erecting some gaps between the burning compartments and the passengers. At the same time, Vinod proposes sending a helicopter to land a person on the engine which was voluntarily led by Randhir for sabotage. Anyway, he succeeds but falsifies by announcing his death as the helicopter explodes. Meanwhile, Ashok identifies the reason behind Seema's betrayal as her disability, and they reconcile. Ravi divulges his identity to Madhu, yet, she accepts his love, as well as, Sheetal returns to Vinod and boasts his courage. At Bombay, Rakesh plans to build a steep incline to reduce the speed. Beyond, as an end-run, dauntless Vinod boards Super Express using another engine speeding parallel to it and plans to move from one train car to another with fireproof suits and also carry dynamite. Soon, Vinod, Ashok, and Ravi cross the fire. Thereafter, Vinod detects that all systems of the engine have failed when Ashok thinks of blasting the couplings of the compartments to the engine. Vinod disagrees as it leads to derailing at such a speed then he favours the incline built by Rakesh.  Ravi backs the plan and instructs passengers to tie themselves to their seats to avoid injury. Vinod and Ashok set up the dynamite towards blast while the train is climbing towards the incline and then jump off the slowing engine. Nevertheless, the engine blasts at Bombay Railway Station but the compartments slow down and halt. Finally, the passengers rejoin their relative's tribute to the soul of India. Vinod, Ravi, and Ashok are happy in their love life.

Cast

Soundtrack

Legacy 
The song “Bang Bang” by Pete Cannon which was used for the advert of 2018 Apple iPhone X, samples the music from "Meri Nazar Hai Tujh Pe".

See also 

 Speed (1994 film) - Hollywood movie starring Keanu Reeves, have similar story. 
 Unstoppable (2010 film) - Hollywood movie starring Denzel Washington in lead role.

References

External links
 

1980 films
1980s Hindi-language films
Films scored by R. D. Burman
Films set on trains
Indian action thriller films
1980 action thriller films
Films directed by Ravi Chopra
Indian remakes of Japanese films
Indian pregnancy films